The acrotelm is one of two distinct layers in undisturbed peat bogs. It overlies the catotelm.  The boundary between the two layers is defined by the transition from peat containing living plants (acrotelm) to peat containing dead plant material (catotelm).  This typically coincides with the lowest level of the water table. To lower the water table before harvesting, ditching is performed first. As a result, the acrotelm becomes thicker and more effective, drying the peat and making harvesting more simple. Dranaige and subsidence lower the elevation of the peat surface, significantly lowering the soil's hydraulic conductivity. Fluctuations in water table in a peat bog occur within the acrotelm, and hence conditions may vary from aerobic to anaerobic with time.

See also 
Raised bog

Mire

Swamp

References

Bogs
Pedology